Super 5 Land Transport and Services Incorporated (Super 5) formerly Super Five Transport Incorporated is a bus company based in Iligan City, Philippines. It operates bus transport services in northern Mindanao with its main hubs in Cagayan de Oro and Iligan.

History
Super 5 Land Transport and Services was established on May 5, 1987, by Paul Padayhag of Iligan City. It first served the Cagayan–Iligan–Pagadian route using Philippines-made Mercedes-Benz buses. Years later, they added Cagayan–Iligan–Ozamiz–Dipolog and Cagayan–Valencia–Wao routes.

Despite a history of  financial setbacks and temporary unit confiscations by the authorities due to violations, the company managed to compete with its rival in the region, Rural Transit.

Fleet

The first bus units of Super 5 came from Nissan Diesel and Mercedes-Benz. During the 2010s, however, they altogether decommissioned those units and replaced them with those from Chinese bus manufacturers Yutong and Higer, making them the first company in Mindanao to have units from Chinese bus manufacturers.

The company is also the first in Mindanao to use diesel-electric hybrid buses for their fleet, which they bought from Higer in year 2018.

The fleet is composed of:
 Higer KLQ6123K
 Higer KLQ6125A
 Higer KLQ6112H
 Higer KLQ6112HEQ30
 Higer KLQ6125B
 Higer KLQ6125BA
 Higer KLQ6115HZAHEVE50E
 Higer KLQ6115HZ
 Yutong ZK6119H2
 Yutong ZK6122HD9
 Yutong ZK6107HA
 Yutong ZK6105H
 Yutong ZK6127H
 Yutong ZK6878H

Routes
Cagayan de Oro Wao (via Valencia) (suspended)
Cagayan de Oro Dipolog (via Iligan Mukas Ozamiz Oroquieta)
Cagayan de Oro Pagadian (via Iligan Kapatagan)
Cagayan de Oro Maramag (via Valencia)
Cagayan de Oro Iligan (via Laguindingan)
Pagadian Ozamiz (via Molave) (suspended)
Cagayan de Oro Kibawe (via Valencia Maramag) (suspended)

See also
 Vallacar Transit
 Lilian Express
 Pabama Transport
 List of bus companies of the Philippines

References

Bus companies of the Philippines
Transportation in Mindanao
Iligan
Transport companies established in 1988
1988 establishments in the Philippines